Hoba Hoba Spirit is a musical fusion band based in Casablanca, Morocco that was formed in 1998. It is composed of Adil Hanine (drummer), Anouar Zehouani (guitarist), Saâd Bouidi (Bass guitar), Reda Allali - (vocalist and guitarist) and Othmane Hmimar(percussionist). The name of the group is based on a song by Bob Marley.

Hoba Hoba Spirit's musical style mixes Rock, Reggae and Gnawa. They refer to their music as "Hayha". Their lyrics are mostly in Darija (Moroccan dialect), French and sometimes English. Recurring themes in their songs are the disorientation and confusion of young Moroccans.

A notable duo of Hoba Hoba Spirit was with Moroccan rapper Bigg in a single called "Goulou Bazz", which was a huge success. The single is included in the album Trabando.

Since 2003, the band has emerged as one of the most popular rock acts in Morocco, frequently playing the country's major festivals, such as the Mawazine Festival in Rabat, L'Boulevard Tremplin in Casablanca, Timitar Festival in Agadir, and the Gnaoua and World Music Festival in Essaouira.

During the 2007 Mghrib Music Award, Hoba Hoba Spirit won three awards in the categories of "best fusion artist, best album for "Trabando", released in 2007, and best title for the song "Fhamator."

Discography
 Hoba Hoba Spirit (2003)
 Casa
 Soudani
 Maricane
 Gnawa Blues
 Fine Ghadi Biya
 Basta Lahya
 La tele
 La'hrig

 Blad Skizo(2005)
 Jamal
 Blad Schizo
 Chalala...
 Ma Ajebtinich
 El Kelb
 Aourioura
 El Caïd Mötorhead
 Seddina (wa choukrane)

 Trabando (2007)
 Hoba's Back
 Intikhabat
 Fhamatôr
 Kalakh
 Baz feat. Bigg
 Maradona
 Zerda
 Tiqar
 Marock'n Roll II
 Miloudi
 Trabando
 Super Caïd

 El Gouddam (2008)

 Radio Hoba
 Hyati
 Wakel Chareb Na3ess feat. Stati
 Jdoudna kanou shah
 60%
 Rabe3a
 Femme Actuelle
 Arnaque mondiale
 El Gouddam
 Spoutnik

 Nefs & Niya (2010)

 Bab Sebta
 Les Anesthésistes
 Dark Bendir Army
 Terrorist
 Black Moussiba
 Fawda
 Al Qanat Assaghira
 The Debil
 Happy Hour
 Qadi Hajto
 Nefs & Niya

 Kalakhnikov  (2013)

 Kalakhnikov 
 Sidi Bouzekri
 Grimma Awards
 Ketama Airways
 Khoroto driver
 Abdelkader
 Kerch power
 Heroes
 La ra7ma la chfa9a
 La volonté de vivre

 Kamayanbaghi (2018) The cover art of this album was designed by Rebel Spirit.

 Tri9i
 Moulay Tahar
 Le Maroc
 Fitna
 Dégoutage
 Décalage
 Mchat 3lia
 Zerbana
 La logique
 Nabil Lhbil
 L'b7ar
 Jnouni

References

External links
  Official website
  An interview with Hoba Hoba Spirit

Moroccan reggae musical groups
Musical groups established in 1998
Casablanca